Isatou Jallow (born October 10, 1997) is a Gambian footballer, who plays for the Gambian senior national team. She previously represented Gambia at under-age level, before proceeding to the senior national team. At club level, she plays for Rivers Angels in the Nigeria Women Premier League. Before joining Angels, she previously played for F.C. Ramat HaSharon in Israel.

References 

Expatriate footballers in Nigeria Women Premier League
Living people
1997 births
The Gambia women's international footballers
Women's association football forwards
Gambian women's footballers
Rivers Angels F.C. players
Gambian expatriate women's footballers
Expatriate women's footballers in Israel
Expatriate women's footballers in Nigeria